Michael Reudenbach (born 13 September 1956) is a German composer. He performs as an interpreter of Early and New Music.

Life and achievements 
Reudenbach was born in Aachen. After training as a church musician from 1976 to 1982, Reudenbach studied musical composition from 1986 with Joachim Blume in Cologne and Denis Cohen in Paris. In 1984 he took part in interpretation courses with Philippe Herreweghe. In 1990/1991 he attended composition courses with Helmut Lachenmann and Mathias Spahlinger.

Since the winter semester 2016 he has been Professor of Composition/Music Theory at the Frankfurt University of Music and Performing Arts.

Reudenbach received prizes and scholarships from the Akademie Schloss Solitude and the Heinrich-Strobel-Stiftung of the Südwestrundfunk among other.

Works 
mirlitonnades pour petite flûte (1991)
Choral for voice and 5 instruments (1991)
Szenen, Standbilder for 4 instruments (1992, 1993–1995)
duo pianism for 2 pianos (1993)
… Zitate, Berührungen … for bass clarinet, harp, double bass, percussion and playback CD (1993, revised in 2000)
 Danach for string quintet (1994)
 Noch nicht – Nicht mehr for voices and playback-CD (1997, revised in 2014)
 Zählergesang for Ensemble (1997)
 Fond III for bass flute (also radio) violoncello and piano (1998)
 (Bruch)Stück(e) for 6 instruments (1999)
 Abdruck for 5 speakers, 41 instrumentalists and playback (2000–2001)
 kommen – Überschreibungen for 5 voices (2001)
 Schnitt & Fortsetzung for flute, harp, guitar, piano and timpani (2003)
 und aber. Music for string quartet (2004)
 Madrigal for Ensemble (2005/2006)
 Stück=Werk for 7 instruments (2006-…)
 Trio. Study for piano, violin and cello (2007)
 ahto. Music for 8 instruments (2008)
 Stratton for Ensemble (2008/2009)
 Trio 3 for basset horn, bass clarinet and piano (2009)
 Still for five instruments (2012/13)
 white radiation – LichtKlang-Abtastungen for robots, objects and 16 strings players (2013–2014) – in collaboration with Joachim Fleischer (Roboterchoreographie and Licht)
 5 Raumetüden for voices (2015–2016)
 Fragmente ohne Titel for 2 x 3 instruments (2016)
 Hossdorfs Laboratorium – 5 Modellversuche für Ensemble in einem 360°-Konzertraum (2016–2017)

Publications 
 Laut und Leise (M. Reudenbach im Gespräch mit Yvonne Charl). In: Unerhört – Konkrete und visuelle Poesie. Aachen 1999, .
 Toccatina. Eine Erinnerung. In auf(-) und zuhören, 14 essayistische Reflexionen über die Musik und die Person Helmut Lachenmanns. Hofheim 2005, .
 Gedächtnisbilder. In Musik-Kulturen – Darmstädter Diskurse 2. Saarbrücken 2008, .
 Vom Umkehren. In KunstMusik – Schriften zur Musik als Kunst. Heft 13. Köln 2010, .
 Die Zukunft von der Vergangenheit befreien? Die Vergangenheit von der Zukunft befreien? Gedanken zu Mathias Spahlinger's „adieu m'amour - hommage à guillaume dufay“. In Rückspiegel - Zeitgenössisches Komponieren im Dialog mit älterer Musik. Mainz 2010, .
 Impuls und Korrektur – Beobachtungen zu Im Nebel IV von Leoš Janáček (together with Kerstin Lücker). In Leoš Janáček. Music Concepts Volume 7, 2nd extended edition. Munich 2015. .
 white radiation. LichtKlang-Abtastungen – Werkstatttext über eine Gemeinschaftsarbeit. In MusikTexte. Heft 151. Cologne 2016, .

Further reading 
Stefan Fricke: Stücke zum Stück. Einige Schnipsel zu M. Reudenbachs (Bruch)Stück(e). In . 45, 2000, 
Manfred Karallus: Bruch, Abbruch, Abdruck, Szenen, Standbilder … Zum musikalischen Schaffen von M. Reudenbach. In MusikTexte. 99, 2003, .
Marion Saxer: Ausharren im Paradox – Michael Reudenbachs „und aber. Musik für Streichquartett“. In Neue Zeitschrift für Musik. 2/2006, 
Raoul Mörchen: Michael Reudenbach. In Musik in Geschichte und Gegenwart. Supplement. Kassel, Basel, London, New York, Prague 2008.
Raoul Mörchen: Dass es bleibt. Die Musik Michael Reudenbachs. Begleittext zu: edition-rz 10021-22 (see "CD-s"), 2013.
Christian Kemper: Musik im Konjunktiv. In Musik & Ästhetik. Heft 68. Stuttgart 2013 
Markus Roth: Michael Reudenbach. In Komponisten der Gegenwart (KDG). Munich 2014.
Marion Saxer: Sehnsucht schreiben – Briefe an den Ehemann von Emma Hauck in compositions by Caspar Johannes Walter, Cornelius Schwehr, Jay Schwartz and Michael Reudenbach. In ungesehen und unerhört – Künstler reagieren auf die Sammlung Prinzhorn. Volume 2. Heidelberg: Sammlung Prinzhorn/Wunderhorn 2015. .
Torsten Möller: Offenheit, offene Fragen – Der Komponist Michael Reudenbach. In MusikTexte. Heft 151. Cologne 2016, .

CDs 
szenen, standbilder. werke 1991 – 2009, edition-rz 10021-22 (2 CDs), 2013.
Instrumentale Kammermusik: Spiel – Kritik – Parodie. Musik in Deutschland 1950–2000. Deutscher Musikrat, RCA Red Seal/Sony BMG Music 74321 73595 2, 2007.
Darmstadt Aural Documents. Box 3 Ensembles. NEOS 11230, 2016.

References

External links 
 Michael Reudenbach in 
 Michael Reudenbach in edition rz
 Michael Reudenbach in entry at the website of the Akademie Schloss Solitude
 Michael Reudenbach in Hochschule für Musik und Darstellende Kunst Frankfurt am Main.
  
 Recordings on JPC

1956 births
Living people
People from Aachen
20th-century German composers
21st-century German composers
Academic staff of the Hochschule für Musik Karlsruhe